A key holder or keyholder may refer to:

A person who has access control
A keychain
A store manager
An individual or organisation with access to a cryptographic key

Music
 Keyholder (album), a 2003 album by Kaipa
 "Keyholder," a song by Benea Reach